The 1994 1. divisjon, Norway's second-tier football league, began play on 1 May 1994 and ended on 2 October 1994. The league was contested by 24 teams, divided in two groups. Due to an expansion from 12 to 14 teams in Tippeligaen, the top two teams of each group won promotion to Tippeligaen and the bottom two teams were relegated to the 2. divisjon. This was the first season the two groups were named with numbers instead of letters.

Strindheim, Hødd, Stabæk and Molde won promotion to Tippeligaen, while Stjørdals/Blink, Bærum, Vidar, Mjøndalen was relegated to the 2. divisjon.

Tables

Group 1

Group 2

Top goalscorers

19 goals:
Arild Stavrum, Molde
17 goals:
Anders Michelsen, Drøbak/Frogn
13 goals:
Kent Bergset, Fyllingen
Jan-Petter Olsen, Skeid
12 goals:
Atle H. Markussen, Eik
Fredrik Gärdeman, Stabæk
11 goals:
Tommy Sylte, Hødd
Per Joar Hansen, Stjørdals-Blink
Terje Ellingsen, Mjølner

See also
 1994 Tippeligaen
 1994 2. divisjon
 1994 3. divisjon

References

Norwegian First Division seasons
2
Norway
Norway